The 2023 Indiana Hoosiers football team will represent Indiana University in the 2023 NCAA Division I FBS football season. The Hoosiers are led by seventh-year head coach Tom Allen. They will play their home games at Memorial Stadium in Bloomington, Indiana as members of the Big Ten Conference.

Previous season

The 2021 team finished the 2021 season 4–7, 2–7 in Big Ten play to finish second-to-last place in the East division. Indiana's two non-conference wins were against opponents Idaho and Western Kentucky. The Hoosiers' conference wins were against Illinois and out-of-state rival Michigan State.

Offseason

Coaching changes
Following the end of the 2022 season, Indiana released six-year veteran offensive line coach Darren Hiller; Hiller had been a part of the Hoosier's two recent bowl appearances in 2019 and 2020 On December 2, 2022, Indiana hired Wisconsin Badgers offensive line coach Bob Bostad to replace the outgoing Hiller; Bostad had coached the Badgers' offensive line during both the 2017 Orange Bowl and the 2020 Rose Bowl.

Schedule

References

Indiana
Indiana Hoosiers football seasons
Indiana Hoosiers football